Faithfully Yours is a 1988 Hong Kong romantic comedy film, directed by Wong Wa-kei and starring Jacky Cheung, Max Mok, Stephen Chow and Sharla Cheung.

Plot
Happy, Big Eye and Puddin Lai are good friends, Happy is a hairstylist who opens his "Great Grass Hair Salon" next to the "Great Shanghai Hair Salon", which dissatisfies Greater Shanghai's owner, Chuk Tai-chung. While the two are at loggerheads on the occasion, Chuk's daughter, Ying, goes to Great Grass Hair Salon and the three friends do their best to pursue her. One time during a drunk accident, Ying becomes pregnant but does not know who the father is and can only wait the birth of her child to confirm the identity. Happy, Big Eye and Puddin begin to fawn Ying and her family in every possible way, resulting in a series of big jokes.

Cast
Jacky Cheung as Happy Chan Hoi-sam
Max Mok as Big Eye / Kei Ho-yan
Stephen Chow as Puddin Lai
Sharla Cheung as Ying
Richard Ng as Chuk Tai-chung / Shanghai Man, Ying's father
Lydia Shum as Shanghai Lady, Ying's mother
Teddy Yip as Ying's godfather
Sing Yan as barbershop assistant
Mak Ho Wai as rich taxi driver
Bowie Wu as Birdy
Law Ching-ho as Elephant 
Liu Kai-chi as medical laboratory worker
Cheung Yuen-wah as girl in maternity ward
Alan Chan as doctor
Joyce Cheng as infant
Yuen Ling-to

Box office
The film grossed HK$5,807,710 at the Hong Kong box office during its theatrical run from 8 December 1988 to 5 January 1989 in Hong Kong.

See also
Jacky Cheung filmography

External links

Faithfully Yours at Hong Kong Cinemagic

Faithfully Yours film review at LoveHKFilm.com

1988 films
1988 romantic comedy films
Hong Kong romantic comedy films
Hong Kong slapstick comedy films
1980s Cantonese-language films
Films set in Hong Kong
Films shot in Hong Kong
1980s Hong Kong films